Aspidonepsis is a genus of flowering plants belonging to the family Apocynaceae.

Its native range is Southern Africa.

Species:

Aspidonepsis cognata 
Aspidonepsis diploglossa 
Aspidonepsis flava 
Aspidonepsis reenensis 
Aspidonepsis shebae

References

Apocynaceae
Apocynaceae genera